The Frugal Four is the nickname of an informal cooperation among like-minded fiscally conservative European countries, including Austria, Denmark, the Netherlands and Sweden. It partly evolved as a successor of the New Hanseatic League that was set up to make up for the loss of the like-minded United Kingdom in the European political arena after Brexit. However, it was never founded as a transnational organisation like similar cooperations of countries in the European Union with shared interests.

Along with like-minded Germany, the Frugal Four advocate for EU budget rebates and tight fiscal policies in the eurozone governed by the Stability and Growth Pact, and generally advocate against a large distributive European budget and collective EU debt. They are, however, not Eurosceptic.

The Frugal Four experienced widespread media coverage throughout the COVID-19 pandemic in Europe.

Position
In an op-ed by Austria's former chancellor Sebastian Kurz published in the Financial Times, he described the goals of the Frugal Four as a focus on budget contribution to the EU remaining stable, namely at a maximum of 1 per cent of the EU's gross national income, as well as devoting at least 25 per cent of it to fighting climate change. Furthermore, the Frugal Four wish for spending conditions that are tied to supporting the effective implementation of EU-wide policy objectives and the upholding of the rule of law. These positions came as a response to those countries within the bloc that see a need for higher contributions to the EU's budget after Brexit. The Frugal Four also disagrees with the idea of Eurobonds, a tool for joint bonds within the eurozone, as well as taking mutualised debts within the EU. As a consequence, the group stands opposed to the idea of corona bonds as well.

Frugal Four heads of government in 2023

COVID-19 pandemic and member change
During a summit of EU leaders on March 26, 2020, Germany and the Frugal Four rejected a joint European recovery initiative. Germany was widely considered to be as fiscally conservative as the Frugal Four, hence the context in which the coalition of states was also sometimes referred to as the "Frugal Five". This changed in May 2020 the latest when Germany joined France's call for a €500 billion recovery fund for the EU. This new measure to tackle the pandemic and its consequences would lead to shared borrowing with other EU member countries, a position that Germany tried to avoid until that point. Later the original group's demands were supported by Finland.

Although the Frugal Four in a non-paper vetoed any deal “leading to debt mutualisation”, they eventually accepted the joint European Next Generation EU fund on the European Council in July 2020.

References

Organizations related to the European Union
Foreign relations of Austria
Foreign relations of Denmark
Foreign relations of the Netherlands
Foreign relations of Sweden
International organizations based in Europe
Intergovernmental organizations

Political responses to the COVID-19 pandemic
International responses to the COVID-19 pandemic
Fiscal federalism
Consequences of Brexit